Kyauk Thin Pone Tway Moe Htar Tae Eain is a 2010 Burmese comedy-drama film, directed by Ko Zaw (Ar Yone Oo) starring Kyaw Ye Aung, Pyay Ti Oo, Htoo Khant Kyaw, Soe Myat Thuzar, Thet Mon Myint, Chaw Yadanar and Khin Hlaing. The film, produced by Shwe Taung Yadanar Film Production premiered Myanmar on September 10, 2010.

Cast
Kyaw Ye Aung as Phay Than
Pyay Ti Oo as Thaw Tar Phone
Htoo Khant Kyaw as Ko Oak
Soe Myat Thuzar as Shwe Nwe
Thet Mon Myint as Mi Chaw
Chaw Yadanar as Thidar Win
Khin Hlaing as Ko San

References

2010 films
2010s Burmese-language films
Burmese comedy-drama films
Films shot in Myanmar
2010 comedy-drama films